Nils Linneberg (born 4 October 1967) is a Chilean alpine skier. He competed at the 1988, 1992, 1994 and the 1998 Winter Olympics.

References

1967 births
Living people
Chilean male alpine skiers
Olympic alpine skiers of Chile
Alpine skiers at the 1988 Winter Olympics
Alpine skiers at the 1992 Winter Olympics
Alpine skiers at the 1994 Winter Olympics
Alpine skiers at the 1998 Winter Olympics
Sportspeople from Santiago
20th-century Chilean people